Yango-Asker is a rural locality (a selo) in Lineyninsky Selsoviet, Narimanovsky District, Astrakhan Oblast, Russia. The population was 226 as of 2010. There are 2 streets.

Geography 
Yango-Asker is located 71 km southwest of Narimanov (the district's administrative centre) by road. Krasnye Barrikady is the nearest rural locality.

References 

Rural localities in Narimanovsky District